The Sharafnama (Kurdish: شەرەفنامە Şerefname, "The Book of Honor", Persian: Sharafname, شرفنامه) is the famous book of Sharaf al-Din Bitlisi (a medieval Kurdish historian and poet) (1543–1599), which he wrote in 1597, in Persian. Sharafnama is regarded as an important and oldest source on Kurdish history. It deals with the different Kurdish dynasties such as, Saladin the Great and his Ayyubid Dynasty, ancient and Medieval Kurdish principalities in the Middle-East and the Caucasus, as well as some mentioning about the pre-Islamic ancestors of the Kurds.

History

Sharaf Khan Bidlisi was born on February 25, 1543, son of Shamsaddin Batlisi, in the Garmrood village. In 1576 Tahmasb of the Safavids gives him the title the Mir of Mirs ("commander of commanders"); appoints him leader of all Iranian Kurdish tribes.

In 1578, Sharafkhan abandons his previous stand, and supports the Ottomans in their war against the Iranians, offering them 400 soldiers. Between 1578 and 1588, Sharafkhan virtually led all the Ottoman wars against the Persians. Sultan Murad III, the Ottoman Sultan, grants Sharafkhan the title of Khan. He becomes the Mir of the Batlisi province. As he turned 53, Sharafkhan gives the authority of his dynasty to his son Shamsaddin Bag Abu Alma'ali. He begins writing the book Sharafnama in 1597.

Translations
In 1873–1875, François Charmoy, a French scholar, translated it from Persian into French and published it in Saint Petersburg, Russia. At the right, it is a Kurdish–French dictionary, made by Alexandre Jaba, and published in 1879 in Saint Pertersburg, too. The Sherefname has been translated into the languages  German, Arabic, English, Ottoman, Russian, and Turkish. In 1972 the Kurdish scholar Abdurrahman Sharafkandi, translated the book from Persian into Kurdish.

Gallery

See also
 List of Kurdish people
 Kurdish history
 Ayyubid Dynasty

References

Further reading

External links
 KURDISTANICA is a digital information and database 

History of the Kurdish people
Persian-language books